Lauro Júnior Batista da Cruz, simply known as Lauro (born 3 September 1980 in Andradina), is a Brazilian footballer who plays as a goalkeeper for Joinville Esporte Clube.

References

External links
 Guardian Stats Centre
 sambafoot
 zerozero.pt
 soccerterminal
 CBF
 Lauro at Soccerway

1980 births
Living people
Brazilian footballers
Association football goalkeepers
Campeonato Brasileiro Série A players
Campeonato Brasileiro Série B players
Associação Atlética Ponte Preta players
Cruzeiro Esporte Clube players
Sertãozinho Futebol Clube players
Sport Club Internacional players
Associação Portuguesa de Desportos players
Associação Chapecoense de Futebol players
Clube Atlético Bragantino players
Clube Esportivo Lajeadense players
Clube Atlético Mineiro players
Ceará Sporting Club players
People from Andradina